The Great American Smokeout is an annual intervention event on the third Thursday of November by the American Cancer Society. Approximately 40 million American adults still smoke, and tobacco use remains the single largest preventable cause of disease and premature death in the country. The event challenges people to quit on that day, or use the day to make a plan to quit.

History

The first Great American Smokeout was held  in San Francisco's Union Square on November 16, 1977.  The event evolved from a series of smaller-scale initiatives.  In 1970, in Randolph, Massachusetts, Arthur P. Mullaney suggested people give up cigarettes for a day and donate the money to a local high school. In 1974, a "Don't Smoke Day" (or "D-Day") was promoted by Lynn R. Smith of the Monticello Times in Monticello, Minnesota. On November 18, 1976, the California Division of the American Cancer Society successfully prompted nearly one million smokers to quit for the day. That California event marked the first Smokeout.

See also

 World No Tobacco Day
 No Smoking Day (UK)

References

External links 
 American Cancer Society
 ACS Great American Smokeout page
 Tricare Management Activity/DoD Great American Smokeout page
 Prevention Partners Great American Smokeout page
 Happy Great American Smokeout Day

Health education in the United States
Health awareness days
Smoking in the United States
November observances
American Cancer Society
Thursday observances